Taungtha may refer to:

Taungtha people
Rungtu, or Taungtha language
Taungtha, Magway
Taungtha, Mandalay, seat of Taungtha Township
Taungtha Township, Mandalay Region

Language and nationality disambiguation pages